The following list is a discography of production by American rapper and hip hop record producer Dr. Dre. It includes a list of singles produced, co-produced and remixed by year, artist, album and title.

Singles produced

1985

World Class Wreckin' Cru – World Class 
 01. "The Planet"
 02. "World Class"
 03. "Surgery (remix)"
 04. "Juice"
 05. "(Horney) Computer"
 06. "Gang Bang You're Dead"
 07. "Lovers" – (featuring Mona Lisa Young)

1986

World Class Wreckin' Cru – Rapped in Romance 
 01. "Mission Possible"
 02. "He's Bionic"
 03. "B.S"
 04. "Love Letter"
 05. "The Fly"
 06. "World Class Freak"
 07. "Wreckin Cru Blues"
 08. "Masters Of Romance"

1987

C.I.A. – My Posse 
 01. "My Posse"
 02. "Jus 4 The Cash $"
 03. "Ill-legal"

N.W.A – N.W.A and the Posse 
 01. "Boyz-n-the-Hood" (Eazy-E)
 02. "8 Ball" (Eazy-E)
 03. "Dunk the Funk" (The Fila Fresh Crew)
 04. "Scream" (Rappinstine)
 05. "Drink It Up" (The Fila Fresh Crew)
 06. "Panic Zone" (N.W.A)
 07. "L.A. Is the Place" (Eazy-E and Ron-De-Vu)
 08. "Dope Man" (N.W.A)
 09. "Tuffest Man Alive" (The Fila Fresh Crew)
 10. "Fat Girl" (Eazy-E and Ron-De-Vu)
 11. "3 the Hard Way" (The Fila Fresh Crew)

*The 1989 re-release replaced "Scream" with N.W.A's "A Bitch Iz a Bitch".

1988

Bobby Jimmy and the Critters – Milkshake / Overlapping Waist 12" 
 01. "Milkshake" (Produced with Arabian Prince)

Bobby Jimmy and the Critters – NY/LY Rappers / Fone Freak 12" 
 01. "NY/LA Rappers" 
 02. "Fone Freak"
 03. "Wienie Whistlers"

J. J. Fad – Supersonic 
 01. "Supersonic"
 02. "Way Out"
 03. "Blame It On The Muzick"
 04. "In The Mix"
 05. "Eenie Meenie Beats"
 06. "My Dope Intro"
 07. "Let's Get Hyped"
 08. "Now Really"
 09. "Time Tah Get Stupid"
 10. "Is It Love"

Eazy-E – Eazy-Duz-It 
01. "Still Talkin'"
02. "Nobody Move"
03. "Ruthless Villain"
04. "2 Hard Mutha's"
05. "Boyz-n-the-Hood (Remix)"
06. "Eazy-Duz-It"
07. "We Want Eazy"
08. "Eazy-Er Said Than Dunn"
09. "Radio"
10. "No More ?'s"
11. "I'mma Break It Down"
12. "Eazy-Chapter 8 Verse 10 (B.U.L.L.S.H.I.T.)"
13. "We Want Eazy (Remix)"
14. "Still Talkin' (Remix)"
*Tracks 13 and 14 were included in the 2015 re-release.

N.W.A – Straight Outta Compton 
 01. "Straight Outta Compton"
 02. "Fuck Tha Police"
 03. "Gangsta Gangsta"
 04. "If it Ain't Ruff"
 05. "Parental Discretion Iz Advised"
 06. "8 Ball (Remix)"
 07. "Something Like That"
 08. "Express Yourself"
 09. "Compton's N the House"
 10. "I Ain't Tha 1"
 11. "Dope Man (Remix)"
 12. "Quiet On Tha Set"
 13. "Something 2 Dance 2"

Various artists – Coming to America OST 
 07. "Comin Correct" (J. J. Fad)

1989

N.W.A – Express Yourself 12" 
 B2. "A Bitch Iz A Bitch"

Michel'le – Michel'le 
 01. "No more lies"
 02. "Nicety"
 03. "If?"
 04. "Keep watchin' 
 05. "Something in my heart 
 06. "100% woman
 08. "Never been in love"
 09. "Close to me"
 10. "Special thanks"

The D.O.C. – No One Can Do It Better 
 01. "It's Funky Enough"
 02. "Mind Blowin'" 
 03. "Lend Me An Ear" 
 04. "Comm.Blues" 
 05. "Let The Bass Go" 
 06. "Beautiful But Deadly" 
 07. "The D.O.C. and The Doctor" 
 08. "No One Can Do It Better" 
 09. "Whirlwind Pyramid" 
 10. "Comm.2" 
 11. "The Formula" 
 12. "Portrait of a Masterpiece" 
 13. "The Grande Finale" (featuring N.W.A)

1990

Above the Law – Livin' Like Hustlers 
(Produced with A.T.L. and Laylaw)
 01. "Murder Rap" 
 02. "Untouchable"
 03. "Livin' Like Hustlers"
 04. "Another Execution"
 05. "Menace to Society"
 06. "Just Kickin' Lyrics"
 07. "Ballin'"
 08. "Freedom of Speech"
 09. "Flow On"
 10. "The Last Song" (featuring N.W.A)

Various artists – The Return of Superfly (soundtrack) 
 02. "Eazy Street" (Eazy-E)

N.W.A – 100 Miles and Runnin' 
 01. "100 Miles And Runnin'" 
 02. "Just Don't Bite It" 
 03. "Sa Prize (Part 2)" 
 04. "Real Niggaz"
 05. "Kamurshol"

1991

N.W.A – Niggaz4Life 
 01. "Prelude"
 02. "Real Niggaz Don't Die"
 03. "Niggaz 4 Life"
 04. "Protest (Interlude)"
 05. "Appetite for Destruction"
 06. "Don't Drink That Wine (Interlude)" 
 07. "Alwayz into Somethin'"
 08. "Message to B.A. (Interlude)" 
 09. "Real Niggaz"
 10. "To Kill a Hooker (Interlude)" 
 11. "One Less Bitch"
 12. "Findum, Fuckum, & Flee" 
 13. "Automobile"
 14. "She Swallowed It"
 15. "I'd Rather Fuck You" 
 16. "Approach to Danger"
 17. "1-900-2-Compton (Interlude)" 
 18. "Dayz of Wayback"

Jimmy Z – Muzical Madness 
 01. "Prelude" (featuring Dr. Dre)
 02. "Whatever You Want"
 03. "Funky Flute" (featuring Dr. Dre) 
 04. "Phone Sexxx"
 05. "Reeperbahn"
 06. "Reazons"
 07. "Who'z Leroy"
 08. "Crazy You"
 09. "Watching You"
 10. "Summertime"
 11. "Evil"
 12. "Hip Hop Harmonica"
 13. "Muzical Madness"

1992

Various artists – Deep Cover Soundtrack 
 01. "Deep Cover" (Dr. Dre and Snoop Dogg)
 02. "Love or Lust" (Jewell)

Dr. Dre – The Chronic 
 01. "The Chronic" (Intro) (featuring Snoop Dogg)
 02. "Fuck wit Dre Day (And Everybody's Celebratin')" (featuring Snoop Dogg, Jewell and RBX)
 03. "Let Me Ride" (featuring Jewell)
 04. "The Day the Niggaz Took Over" (featuring Daz Dillinger, RBX and Snoop Dogg)
 05. "Nuthin' but a 'G' Thang" (featuring Snoop Dogg)
 06. "Deeez Nuuuts" (featuring Daz Dillinger, Snoop Dogg, Nate Dogg and Warren G)
 07. "Lil' Ghetto Boy" (featuring Snoop Dogg and Daz Dillinger)
 08. "A Nigga Witta Gun"
 09. "Rat-Tat-Tat-Tat"
 10. "The $20 Sack Pyramid" (Skit)
 11. "Lyrical Gangbang" (featuring The Lady of Rage, Kurupt and RBX)
 12. "High Powered" (featuring RBX, The Lady of Rage and Daz Dillinger)
 13. "The Doctor's Office" (Skit)
 14. "Stranded on Death Row" (featuring Bushwick Bill, Kurupt, The Lady of Rage, RBX and Snoop Dogg)
 15. "The Roach [The Chronic Outro]" (featuring RBX)
 16. "Bitches Ain't Shit" (featuring Daz Dillinger, Kurupt, Snoop Dogg, The Lady of Rage and Jewell)

Dr. Dre – Dre Day 12" 
 A3. "Puffin On Blunts and Drankin Tanqueray" (featuring The Lady of Rage, Daz Dillinger and Kurupt)
 B2. "One Eight Seven" (featuring Snoop Dogg) (alternate version of Deep Cover)

1993

Various artists – Poetic Justice Soundtrack 
 10. "Niggas Don't Give a Fuck" (Tha Dogg Pound featuring D-Ruff)

Snoop Dogg – Doggystyle 
 01. "Bathtub"
 02. "G Funk Intro" (featuring The Lady of Rage and George Clinton)
 03. "Gin and Juice"
 04. "Tha Shiznit"
 05. "Lodi Dodi"
 06. "Murder Was the Case" (featuring Daz Dillinger)
 07. "Serial Killa" (featuring Tha Dogg Pound, RBX and The D.O.C.) (Produced with Daz Dillinger)
 08. "Who Am I (What's My Name)?"
 09. "For All My Niggaz & Bitches" (featuring Tha Dogg Pound, The Lady of Rage and Lil 1/2 Dead) (Produced with Daz Dillinger)
 10. "Ain't No Fun (If the Homies Can't Have None)" (featuring Warren G, Nate Dogg and Kurupt)
 11. "Doggy Dogg World" (featuring Tha Dogg Pound and The Dramatics)
 12. "Gz and Hustlas"
 13. "Pump Pump" (featuring Mr Malik)

1994

Various artists – Above the Rim Soundtrack 
 10. "Afro Puffs" (The Lady of Rage featuring Snoop Dogg)

Various artists – Murder Was the Case 
 01. "Murder Was the Case (Remix)" (Snoop Dogg featuring Daz Dillinger)
 02. "Natural Born Killaz" (Dr. Dre and Ice Cube) (Produced with Sam Sneed)
 06. "Harvest for the World" (Jewell)
 09. "U Better Recognize" (Sam Sneed featuring Dr. Dre) (Produced with Sam Sneed)

1995

Various artists – Friday Soundtrack 
 02. "Keep Their Heads Ringin'" (Dr. Dre), (Co-produced by Sam Sneed)

Dr. Dre – "California Love" 
 The original Dr. Dre single featured Roger Troutman and was intended to be a Dr. Dre release. It ended up appearing on 2Pac's All Eyez On Me album in 1996 with an added 2Pac verse.

1996

2Pac – All Eyez on Me 
Disc 1:
 12. "California Love (Remix)" (featuring Dr. Dre and Roger Troutman)
Disc 2:
 01. "Can't C Me" (featuring George Clinton)

Nas – It Was Written 
 07. "Nas Is Coming" (featuring Dr. Dre)

Dr. Dre – Dr. Dre Presents the Aftermath 
 01. "Aftermath (the Intro)" (RC, Sid McCoy) (Produced with Mel-Man)
 02. "East Coast/West Coast Killas" (Group Therapy)
 03. "Shittin on the World" (D-Ruff, Hands-On, Mel-Man) (Produced with Mel-Man)
 04. "Blunt Time" (RBX) (Produced with Stu-B-Doo)
 05. "Been There, Done That" (Dr. Dre) (Produced with Bud'da)
 12. "Sexy Dance" (Cassandra McCowan, Jheryl Lockhart, RC) (Produced with Bud'da)
 16. "Fame" (Jheryl Lockhart, King T, RC) (Produced with Chris "The Glove" Taylor)

1997

Scarface – The Untouchable 
 13. "Game Over" (featuring Dr. Dre, Ice Cube and Too Short)

The Firm – The Album 
 01. "Intro" (Produced with Chris "The Glove" Taylor)
 02. "Firm Fiasco" (Produced with Chris "The Glove" Taylor)
 04. "Phone Tap" (Produced with Chris "The Glove" Taylor)
 06. "Firm Family" (featuring Dr. Dre) (Produced with Chris "The Glove" Taylor)
 09. "Fuck Somebody Else" (Produced with Chris "The Glove" Taylor)
 11. "Untouchable" (featuring Wizard) (Produced with Mel-Man)
 13. "Five Minutes To Flush" (Produced with Chris "The Glove" Taylor)

1998

King Tee – The Kingdom Come 
 02. "Speak on It"
 04. "Skweeze Ya Ballz" (featuring Baby S) (Produced with Battlecat)
 05. "Monay" (featuring Dr. Dre and Dawn Robinson)
 06. "Da Kron" (featuring Dr. Dre)
 10. "Reel Raw" (featuring Sharief aka Killa Ben)
 13. "6 N 'Na Moe'nin" (featuring Dawn Robinson)
 14. "Step on By" (featuring Dr. Dre, Crystal and RC)
 15. "Big Ballin' (Playin' 2 Win)" (featuring RC)
 16. "Where's T" (featuring Dr. Dre)
 "California Love ('98 Super Remix)"

Various artists – Bulworth Soundtrack 
 01. "Zoom" (Dr. Dre and LL Cool J)

Kurupt – Kuruption! 
Disc 1: The West Coast
 12. "Ask Yourself a Question" (featuring Dr. Dre)

1999

Eminem – The Slim Shady LP 
 02. "My Name Is"
 03. "Guilty Conscience" (featuring Dr. Dre) (Produced with Eminem)
 09. "Role Model" (Produced with Mel-Man)

Snoop Dogg – No Limit Top Dogg 
 02. "Buck 'Em" (featuring Sticky Fingaz)
 12. "Bitch Please" (featuring Xzibit and Nate Dogg)
 18. "Just Dippin'" (featuring Dr. Dre and Jewell)

Various artists – Wild Wild West Soundtrack 
 07. "Bad Guys Always Die" (Dr. Dre and Eminem) (produced with Mel-Man)

Warren G – Game Don't Wait 
 1. Game Don't Wait (Remix featuring Snoop Dogg, Nate Dogg and Xzibit)

Nine Inch Nails – The Fragile 
 08. "Even Deeper" (Mixing)

Kurupt – Tha Streetz Iz a Mutha 
 14. "Ho's a Housewife" (featuring Dr. Dre and Hittman) (Produced with Mel-Man)

Dr. Dre – 2001 
 01. "Lolo" (Intro)
 02. "The Watcher" (Produced with Mel-Man)
 03. "Fuck You" (featuring Devin the Dude and Snoop Dogg) (Produced with Mel-Man)
 04. "Still D.R.E." (featuring Snoop Dogg) (Produced with Mel-Man)
 05. "Big Ego's" (featuring Hittman) (Produced with Mel-Man)
 06. "Xxplosive" (featuring Kurupt, Nate Dogg, Hittman and Six-Two) (Produced with Mel-Man)
 07. "What's the Difference" (featuring Xzibit and Eminem) (Produced with Mel-Man)
 08. "Bar One" (Skit)
 09. "Light Speed" (featuring Hittman) (Produced with Mel-Man)
 10. "Forgot About Dre" (featuring Eminem) (Produced with Mel-Man)
 11. "The Next Episode" (featuring Snoop Dogg, Kurupt and Nate Dogg) (Produced with Mel-Man)
 12. "Let's Get High" (featuring Kurupt, Hittman and Ms Roq) (Produced with Mel-Man)
 13. "Bitch Niggaz" (featuring Snoop Dogg, Hittman and Six-Two) (Produced with Mel-Man)
 14. "The Car Bomb" (Skit)
 15. "Murder Ink" (featuring Hittman and Ms. Roq) (Produced with Mel-Man)
 16. "Ed-Ucation" (featuring Eddie Griffin) (Produced with Mel-Man)
 17. "Some L.A. Niggaz" (featuring Defari, Xzibit, Time Bomb, King T, M.C. Ren, Kokane) (Produced with Mel-Man)
 18. "Pause 4 Porno" (Skit)
 19. "Housewife" (featuring Kurupt and Hittman) (Produced with Mel-Man)
 20. "Ackrite" (featuring Hittman) (Produced with Mel-Man)
 21. "Bang Bang" (featuring Knoc-Turn'al and Hittman) (Produced with Mel-Man)

2000

Hittman 
 00. "Last Dayz"

Ice Cube – War & Peace Vol. 2 (The Peace Disc) 
 01. "Hello" (featuring Dr. Dre and MC Ren)

Eminem – The Marshall Mathers LP 
 02. "Kill You" (Produced with Mel-Man)
 05. "Who Knew" (Produced with Mel-Man)
 08. "The Real Slim Shady" (Produced with Mel-Man)
 09. "Remember Me" (featuring RBX and Sticky Fingaz) (Produced with Mel-Man)
 10. "I'm Back" (Produced with Mel-Man)
 15. "Bitch Please II" (featuring Dr. Dre, Snoop Dogg, Xzibit and Nate Dogg) (Produced with Mel-Man)

Various artists – Next Friday Soundtrack 
 02. "Chin Check" (N.W.A. featuring Snoop Dogg)

Xzibit – Restless 
 04. "U Know" (featuring Dr. Dre) (Produced with Nottz)
 05. "X" (Produced with Mel-Man and Scott Storch)
 13. "Best of Things"

Snoop Dogg – Tha Last Meal 
 01. "Intro"
 02. "Hennesey N Buddah" (featuring Kokane)
 04. "True Lies" (featuring Kokane) (Produced with Mike Elizondo)
 09. "Lay Low" (featuring Master P, Nate Dogg, Butch Cassidy and& Tha Eastsidaz) (Produced with Mike Elizondo)

2001

Eve – Scorpion 
 04. "Let Me Blow Ya Mind" (featuring Gwen Stefani) (Produced with Scott Storch)
 10. "That's What It Is" (featuring Styles P)

D12 – Devil's Night 
 05. "Nasty Mind" (featuring Truth Hurts)
 06. "Ain't Nuttin' But Music"
 11. "Fight Music" (Produced with Scott Storch)
 18. "Revelation"

Bilal – 1st Born Second 
 03. "Fastlane"
 06. "Sally"

Mary J. Blige – No More Drama 
 02. "Family Affair"

Various artists – Training Day Soundtrack 
 04. "Put It on Me" (Dr. Dre and DJ Quik featuring Mimi)

Various artists – The Wash Soundtrack 
 05. "Bad Intentions" (Dr. Dre featuring Knoc-turn'al) (Produced with Mahogany)
 08. "Holla" (Busta Rhymes)
 15. "Str8 West Coast" (Knoc-Turn'al)
 18. "The Wash" (Dr. Dre featuring Snoop Dogg) (Produced with DJ Pooh)

Busta Rhymes – Genesis 
 08. "Truck Volume"
 10. "Break Ya Neck" (Produced with Scott Storch)
 12. "Holla"

Mack 10 – Bang or Ball 
 02. "Hate In Yo Eyes"

Nate Dogg – Music and Me 
 07. "Your Wife" (featuring Dr. Dre)

Warren G – The Return of the Regulator 
 04. "Lookin' at You" (featuring Ms. Toi)

Shaquille O'Neal – Shaquille O'Neal Presents His Superfriends, Vol. 1 
 01. "That's Me" (featuring Dr. Dre)

2002

Devin the Dude – Just Tryin' ta Live 
 02. "It's a Shame" (featuring Pooh Bear)

DJ Quik – Under tha Influence 
 04. "Put It on Me" (featuring Dr. Dre and Mimi) (produced with DJ Quik)

Eminem – The Eminem Show 
 03. "Business"
 17. "Say What You Say" (featuring Dr. Dre)
 19. "My Dad's Gone Crazy"

Truth Hurts – Truthfully Speaking 
 01. "Push Play"(featuring Dr. Dre) 
 04. "Jimmy"
 10. "Queen of the Ghetto"

Various artists – Austin Powers in Goldmember 
 02. "Miss You (Dr. Dre remix)" (The Rolling Stones)

Knoc-Turn'al – L.A. Confidential Presents Knoc-Turn'al 
 01. "The Knoc" (featuring Dr. Dre and Missy Elliott)
 03. "Str8 Westcoast (Remix)" (featuring Warren G, Nate Dogg, Shade Sheist and Xzibit)

Tray Deee – The General's List 
 07. "Finer Thangzzz" (featuring 40 Glocc and L.V.)

Eve – Eve-Olution 
 02. "What!" (featuring Truth Hurts)
 11. "Satisfaction"

Xzibit – Man vs. Machine 
 08. "Choke Me, Spank Me (Pull My Hair)" (featuring Traci Nelson)
 09. "Losin' Your Mind" (featuring Snoop Dogg)

Jay-Z – The Blueprint 2: The Gift & the Curse 
 03. "The Watcher 2" (featuring Dr. Dre, Rakim and Truth Hurts)

Ras Kass – Goldyn Chyld 
 03. "The Whoop" (featuring Busta Rhymes and Dina Rae)

2003

40 Glocc – The Jakal 
 14. "Papa Lil Soldier"

50 Cent – Get Rich or Die Tryin' 
 05. "In da Club"
 07. "Heat"
 08. "If I Can't"
 10. "Back Down"

The D.O.C. – Deuce 
 07. "Psychic Pymp Hotline" (featuring Dr. Dre and Mike Lynn)
 09. "Judgment Day" (featuring Dr. Dre and 6-Two)
 15. "Mentally Disturbed" (featuring 6-Two)

Mary J. Blige – Love & Life 
 04. "Not Today" (featuring Eve)

Obie Trice – Cheers 
 06. "The Set Up" (featuring Nate Dogg) (Produced with Mike Elizondo)
 08. "Shit Hits the Fan" (featuring Dr. Dre and Eminem) (Produced with Mike Elizondo)
 12. "Look In My Eyes" (featuring Nate Dogg) (Produced with Mike Elizondo)
 15. "Oh!" (featuring Busta Rhymes) (Produced with Mike Elizondo)

G Unit – Beg for Mercy 
 02. "Poppin' Them Thangs" (Produced with Scott Storch)
 15. "G'd Up" (Produced with Scott Storch)

2004

Various artists – Barbershop 2: Back in Business Soundtrack 
 01. "Not Today" (Mary J. Blige featuring Eve)

Knoc-Turn'al – The Way I Am 
 11. "I Like" (featuring Yero Brock)

D12 – D12 World 
 18. "American Psycho II" (featuring B-Real) (Produced with Mike Elizondo)

AZ – Decade 1994–2004 
 11. "Time" (featuring Nas and Nature) (Previously unreleased)

Nas – The Prophecy 
 16. "Sosa vs State" (featuring AZ) (Previously unreleased)

Eminem – Encore 
 02. "Evil Deeds"
 03. "Never Enough" (featuring 50 Cent and Nate Dogg) (Produced with Mike Elizondo)
 06. "Mosh" (Produced with Mark Batson)
 10. "Rain Man"
 11. "Big Weenie"
 13. "Just Lose It" (Produced with Mike Elizondo)
 14. "Ass Like That" (Produced with Mike Elizondo)
 20. "Encore/Curtains Down" (featuring Dr. Dre and 50 Cent) (Produced with Mark Batson)

Gwen Stefani – Love. Angel. Music. Baby. 
 02. "Rich Girl" (featuring Eve)

2005

The Game – The Documentary 
 01. "Intro" (Produced with Che Vicious)
 02. "Westside Story" (featuring 50 Cent) (Produced with Scott Storch)
 05. "Higher" (Produced with Mark Batson)
 06. "How We Do" (featuring 50 Cent) (Produced with Mike Elizondo)
 07. "Don't Need Your Love" (featuring Faith Evans) (Additional production with Havoc)
 10. "Start From Scratch" (featuring Marsha Ambrosius) (Produced with Scott Storch)
 17. "Don't Worry" (featuring Mary J. Blige) (Produced with Mike Elizondo)

50 Cent – The Massacre 
 08. "Outta Control" (Produced with Mike Elizondo)
 15. "Gunz Come Out" (Produced with Mike Elizondo)

Various artists – Get Rich or Die Tryin' Soundtrack 
 15. "Talk About Me" (50 Cent) (Produced with Mike Elizondo and Che Vicious)
 16. "When It Rains It Pours" (50 Cent) (Produced with Mike Elizondo and Che Vicious)

Nas – The Prophecy Vol. 2 (The Beginning of The N) 
 27. "Everyday Thing" (featuring Dr. Dre and Nature)

The Game – Ghost Unit 
 02. "Here We Go Again" (featuring Dr. Dre) (Originally intended for Detox)

DJ Fingaz – Guns N' Roses III 
 12. "Hard Liquor" (The Game featuring Kokane)

Hittman – Hittmanic Verses 
 02. "Get Mynz"
 08. "Bloww" (featuring Dr. Dre and Knoc-Turn'al)

Hittman – Murda Weapon 

10. "Ass"
21. "Not Many Dayz Left" (featuring Dr. Dre) (produced with Scott Storch, later re-done for Joe Budden's song "Three Sides To A Story")

Young Maylay – San Andreas: The Original Mixtape 
 08. "Speak On It" (Performed by King Tee)

2006

Mobb Deep – Blood Money 
 16. "Outta Control Remix" (featuring 50 Cent) (Produced with Mike Elizondo)

Busta Rhymes – The Big Bang 
 01. "Get You Some" (featuring Marsha Ambrosius and Q-Tip) (Produced with Mark Batson)
 03. "How We Do It Over Here" (featuring Missy Elliott)
 05. "Been Through The Storm" (featuring Stevie Wonder) (Additional production with Sha Money XL and Black Jeruz)
 06. "In the Ghetto" (featuring Rick James) (Additional production with DJ Green Lantern)
 07. "Cocaina" (featuring Marsha Ambrosius) (Produced with Mark Batson)
 09. "Goldmine" (featuring Raekwon) (Additional production with Erick Sermon)
 11. "Don't Get Carried Away" (featuring Nas)
 15. "Legend of the Fall Off's"

Jay-Z – Kingdom Come 
 05. "Lost One" (featuring Chrisette Michele) (Produced with Mark Batson)
 07. "30 Something"
 11. "Trouble" (Produced with Mark Batson)
 13. "Minority Report" (featuring Ne-Yo)

Snoop Dogg – Tha Blue Carpet Treatment 
 09. "Boss' Life" (featuring Akon) (Produced with Mark Batson)
 12. "Round Here"
 20. "Imagine" (featuring Dr. Dre and D'Angelo) (Produced with Mark Batson)

Stat Quo – Eminem Presents: The Re-Up 
 18. "Get Low"

Nas – Hip Hop Is Dead 
 15. "Hustlers" (featuring The Game and Marsha Ambrosius)

2007

Young Buck – Buck the World 
 08. "Hold On" (featuring 50 Cent) (Produced with Che Vicious)
 11. "U Ain't Goin' Nowhere" (featuring LaToiya Williams) (Produced with Mark Batson)

50 Cent – Curtis 
 06. "Come and Go" (featuring Dr. Dre)
 10. "Straight to the Bank" (Additional production with Ty Fyffe)
 14. "Fire" (featuring Young Buck and Nicole Scherzinger)

Stat Quo – Non album 
 "Here We Go"

Papoose – Non album 
 "Drop It Son" (featuring Busta Rhymes)

2008

Bishop Lamont – The Confessional 
 19. "The Greatest Trick" (Produced with Denaun Porter)

Trick-Trick – The Villain 
 09. "Hold On"

2009

Eminem – Relapse 
 01. "Dr. West" (Skit)
 02. "3 a.m."
 03. "My Mom"
 04. "Insane"
 05. "Bagpipes from Baghdad" (Produced with T. Lawrence)
 06. "Hello" (Produced with Mark Batson)
 07. "Tonya" (Skit)
 08. "Same Song & Dance" (Produced with Dawaun Parker)
 09. "We Made You" (Produced with Eminem and Doc Ish)
 10. "Medicine Ball" (Produced with Mark Batson)
 11. "Paul" (Skit)
 12. "Stay Wide Awake"
 13. "Old Time's Sake" (featuring Dr. Dre) (Produced with Mark Batson)
 14. "Must Be The Ganja" (Produced with Mark Batson)
 15. "Mr. Mathers" (Skit)
 16. "Déjà Vu"
 18. "Crack a Bottle" (featuring Dr. Dre and 50 Cent)
 19. "Steve Berman" (Skit)
 20. "Underground"

Raekwon – Only Built 4 Cuban Linx… Pt. II 
 18. "Catalina" (featuring Lyfe Jennings) (Produced with Mark Batson)
 20. "About Me" (featuring Busta Rhymes) (Produced with Mark Batson)

Snoop Dogg – Death Row: The Lost Sessions Vol. 1 
 02. "Doggystyle" (featuring George Clinton)
 03. "Fallin’ Asleep On Death Row"
 04. "Eat A Dick"
 15. "The Root Of All Evil (Outro)" (featuring Teena Marie)

Dr. Dre – The Chronic & From the Vault 
DVD-Rom
 "Poor Young Dave" (Snoop Doggy Dogg)
 "Smoke On" (Snoop Doggy Dogg) (Bonus track on Walmart version)

50 Cent – Before I Self Destruct 
 03. "Death to My Enemies" (Produced with Mark Batson)
 05. "Psycho" (featuring Eminem) (Produced with Eminem)
 15. "Ok, You're Right" (Produced with Mark Batson)
 00. "I Get It In" (Produced with Dawaun Parker)

40 Glocc – I Am Legend 
17. Finer Thangz (featuring L.V.)

Various artists – Death Row: The Ultimate Box Collection 
Disc 3:
 11. "Midnight Hour" – Lady of Rage
 14. "Real Thugs" – Crooked I

Eminem – Relapse: Refill 
 02. "Hell Breaks Loose" (featuring Dr. Dre) (Produced with Mark Batson)
 03. "Buffalo Bill" (Produced with Mark Batson)
 05. "Taking My Ball"
 06. "Music Box" (Produced with Dawaun Parker)
 07. "Drop the Bomb on 'Em"

2010

Eminem – Recovery 
 13. "So Bad"
 18. "Ridaz" (Bonus track)

Raekwon – Only Built 4 Cuban Linx... Pt. II (Gold Edition) 
 04. "About Me" (featuring The Game) (Bonus track) (Produced with Mark Batson)

Bishop Lamont – The Shawshank Redemption/Angola 3 
 07. "Rain" (featuring Liz Rodrigues)
 21. "Change Is Gonna Come" (featuring Mike Anthony)

Dawaun Parker – The Decision 
 "Lost" (Co. Produced by Dawaun Parker)

Tech N9ne – Bad Season 
 09. "Hard Liquor"

2011

Game – Purp & Patron 
Disc 2:
 07. "Soft Rhodes" (featuring Ashanti)
 15. "The Ocean" (featuring Dr. Dre) (Produced with Che Vicious)

Slim the Mobster – War Music 
 5. "Back Against The Wall" (featuring Dr. Dre) (Produced by Jake One, additional Production by Dr. Dre)

2012

T.I. – Fuck da City Up 
 18. "Popped Off" (featuring Dr. Dre)

Obie Trice – Bottoms Up 
 01. "Bottoms Up (Intro)"

50 Cent – Street King Immortal 
 00. "New Day" (featuring Dr. Dre and Alicia Keys)

Xzibit – Napalm 
 13. "Louis XIII" (featuring King Tee and Tha Alkaholiks)

Alicia Keys – Girl on Fire 
 05. "New Day" (Produced with Swizz Beatz)

Game – Jesus Piece 
 16. "Dead People" (iTunes Store bonus track) (originally intended for The R.E.D. Album)

2014

Stat Quo – ATLA (All This Life Allows) 
 07. "The Way It Be" (featuring Scarface) (Produced with Steve Esterferm)

50 Cent – Animal Ambition 
 05. "Smoke" (featuring Trey Songz) (Produced with Mark Batson )

Marsha Ambrosius – Friends & Lovers 
 07. "Stronger (featuring Dr. Dre)"

2015

Dr. Dre – Compton 
 01. "Intro" (Produced with Focus... and Dontae Winslow)
 04. "It's All On Me" (featuring Justus and BJ the Chicago Kid) (Produced with Bink)
 06. "Darkside/Gone" (featuring King Mez, Marsha Ambrosius and Kendrick Lamar) (Produced with Best Kept Secret and D.R.U.G.S Beats)
 07. "Loose Cannons" (featuring Xzibit, Cold 187um and Sly Pyper) (Produced with Focus... and Trevor Lawrence, Jr.)
 08. "Issues" (featuring Ice Cube, Anderson .Paak and Dem Jointz) (Produced with Focus..., Curt Chambers, Trevor Lawrence, Jr. and Theron Feemster)
 09. "Deep Water" (featuring Kendrick Lamar and Justus) (Produced with Focus..., Cardiak, DJ Dahi & Dem Jointz)
 10. "One Shot One Kill" (Jon Connor featuring Snoop Dogg) (Produced with Focus... and Trevor Lawrence, Jr.)
 16. "Talking to My Diary" (Produced with DJ Silk and Choc)

2016

T.I. 
 "Dope" (featuring Marsha Ambrosius) (Produced with Sir Jinx)

Dr. Dre 
 “Naked” (featuring Sly Pyper and Marsha Ambrosius) (Produced with Siege Monstrasity)
 “Back to Business” (featuring T.I. and Justus) (Produced with Swiff D)
 "Real Hip Hop" (featuring Kurupt and Priscilla) (Produced with Pete Rock)
 "Music 2 Drive-by (Snippet) (Featuring Dem Jointz and Candice Pillay) (Produced with Dem Jointz)

2017

Eminem – Revival 
 06 . Remind Me (Intro)  (Produced with Trevor Lawrence and Neff-U)

Dr. Dre – The Defiant Ones Soundtrack 
 Gunfiyah 
 We Be The Ones (Snippet)

2018

Anderson .Paak – Oxnard 
 04 . Who R U? (Produced with Mell, Dem Jointz and Brissett)
 08 . Mansa Musa (featuring Dr. Dre and Cocoa Sarai) (Produced with Mell)
 12 . Cheers (featuring Q-Tip) (Produced with Mell, Focus... and Q-Tip)
 14 . Left to Right (Produced with Mell and Jason Pounds)

2020

Eminem – Music to Be Murdered By 
 01 ."Premonition" (Intro) (Produced with Dawaun Parker, Eminem, Luis Resto and Mark Baston)
 04 . "Alfred" (interlude) (Produced with Andre "Briss" Brissett and Dawaun Parker)	
 11 . "Stepdad" (Intro)
 14 . "Never Love Again" (Produced with Dawaun Parker, Dem Jointz, Eminem and Trevor Lawrence Jr)
 15 . "Little Engine" (Produced with Dawaun Parker, Erik "Blu2th" Griggs * Trevor Lawrence Jr)
 16 . "Lock It Up" (Produced with Dawaun Parker, Erik "Blu2th" Griggs * Trevor Lawrence Jr)
 20 . "Alfred" (Outro) (Produced with Andre "Briss" Brissett and Dawaun Parker)

Eminem – Music to Be Murdered By – Side B (Deluxe edition) 
 12 ."She Loves Me" (Produced with Dawaun Parker, Erik "Blu2th" Griggs and Trevor Lawrence Jr)
 14 ."Discombobulated" (Produced with S1, Mark Baston, Dawaun Parker, Lonestarrmuzik, Trevor Lawrence Jr and franO)

2021

Dr. Dre – GTA Online: The Contract 
 01. "Gospel" (featuring Eminem) (Produced with Listen2KÖACH)
 02. "The Scenic Route" (featuring Rick Ross and Anderson .Paak) (Produced with Phonix)
 03. "Black Privilege" (Produced with Bink!)
 04. "ETA" (featuring Snoop Dogg, Busta Rhymes and Anderson .Paak) (Produced with J. Lbs)
 05. "Fallin Up" (featuring Thurz and Cocoa Sarai) (Produced with Dem Jointz)
 06. "Diamond Mind" (featuring Nipsey Hussle and Ty Dolla $ign) (Produced with The Alchemist)

2022

DJ Khaled –  God Did  
 03. "Use This Gospel (Remix)" (featuring Kanye West & Eminem) (Produced with The ICU)

2023

Dreamville - Creed III: The Soundtrack  

 04. "Adonis Interlude (The Montage)" (featuring J. Cole)

See also 
 Love for Sale, an unreleased album by Bilal, for which Dr. Dre assisted in producing

References

Production discographies
Production discography
Discographies of American artists
Hip hop discographies